Andrea Habay (1883–1941) was a French film actor. Habay appeared in more forty films during the silent era, mostly in Italy. He also directed three films during the early 1920s. He played the role of Petronius in the 1924 epic Quo Vadis, one of his final films.

Selected filmography

Actor
 Carmen (1914)
 Blue Blood (1914)
 Avatar (1916)
 La falena (1916)
 Ivan the Terrible (1917)
 The Princess of Baghdad (1918)
 Tortured Soul (1919)
 The Redemption (1924)
 Quo Vadis (1924)
 Maciste in the Lion's Cage (1926)
 The Giant of the Dolomites (1927)

References

Bibliography 
 Dalle Vacche, Angela. Diva: Defiance and Passion in Early Italian Cinema. University of Texas Press, 2008. 
 Scodel, Ruth & Bettenworth, Anja. Whither Quo vadis?. Wiley-Blackwell, 2009.

External links 
 

1883 births
1941 deaths
French male film actors
French male silent film actors
French film directors
Male actors from Paris
French expatriates in Italy
Italian people of French descent
20th-century French male actors